Samuel James Smith (24 July 1897 – 8 July 1964) was an Australian politician.

He was born at Pyrmont, the son of Samuel Smith. He worked as a busdriver, and in 1925 became assistant secretary of the Federated Clerks' Union . On 27 October 1928 he married Jessie May Robertson, with whom he had two children. From 1931 to 1940 he was a Labor member of the New South Wales Legislative Council. Smith died at Erskineville in 1964.

References

1897 births
1964 deaths
Australian Labor Party members of the Parliament of New South Wales
Members of the New South Wales Legislative Council
20th-century Australian politicians